GGL may refer to:
 Aeronáutica (Angola), an Angolan airline
 Gajar Gola railway station, in Pakistan
 Gamma-glutamyltransferase 5, an enzyme
 Gander Green Lane, a football stadium in the London Borough of Sutton
 Ganglau language, spoken in Madang Province, Papua New Guinea
 GGL domain, a protein domain
 Goodricke Group Limited, a tea-producing company in West Bengal